Tony Smith may refer to:

Sportsmen

Tony Smith (American football) (born 1970), former professional American football player who played running back for the Atlanta Falcons
Tony Smith (footballer, born 1952), Australian rules football player for Carlton
Tony Smith (footballer, born 1966), Australian rules football player for Sydney
Tony Smith (baseball) (1884–1965), player for the Brooklyn Superbas and Washington Senators
Tony Smith (basketball) (born 1968), retired American professional basketball player
Tony Smith (cricketer, born 1951), South African cricketer
Tony Smith (cricketer, born 1961), English cricketer
Tony Smith (rugby league, born 1967), Australian rugby league footballer and coach
Tony Smith (rugby league, born 1970), English rugby league footballer and coach
Tony Smith (footballer, born 1957), football defender who played for Peterborough, Halifax and Hartlepool
Tony Smith (footballer, born 1973), Scottish-born footballer who played for Airdrieonians and Dundee Utd
Tony Smith (speed skater) (born 1961), New Zealand speed skater

Other people
Tony Smith (philosopher), (born 1951), American philosopher 
Tony Smith (Queensland politician) (born 1950), member of the Australian House of Representatives, 1996–1998
Tony Smith (Australian politician) (born 1967), former Speaker of the Australian House of Representatives
Tony Smith (sculptor) (1912–1980), American sculptor, visual artist, and art theorist
Tony Smith (manager) (born 1945), British music manager
Tony Smith (GC) (1894–1964), British recipient of the George Cross
Tony Smith (East Enders), fictional character on the British soap opera EastEnders
Tony Smith (civil servant) (born 1953), British civil servant
Tony Thunder Smith, American drummer
Tony Dean Smith (born 1977), screenwriter, director and editor

See also
Anthony Smith (disambiguation)
Antonio Smith (disambiguation)